The Rustica di Calabria or Sciara is an indigenous breed of domestic goat from Calabria in southern Italy. It is raised mostly in the provinces of Catanzaro and Cosenza. Although present in substantial numbers it has been little studied; its conservation status and origins remain unclear. It may have been influenced by the various goat breeds, including the Abyssinian goat, the Maltese and a type known as "Tibetan", whose introduction to Calabria in the early twentieth century is documented.

The Rustica di Calabria is one of the forty-three autochthonous Italian goat breeds of limited distribution for which a herdbook is kept by the Associazione Nazionale della Pastorizia, the Italian national association of sheep- and goat-breeders. At the end of 2013 the registered population was 24,130, most of which were in the province of Cosenza.

Use

The milk yield of pluriparous Rustica di Calabria nannies is 200–250 litres per lactation of 150 days. Kids are slaughtered at a weight of 6–7 kg.

References

Goat breeds
Meat goat breeds
Dairy goat breeds
Goat breeds originating in Italy